Halldórr ókristni (The Unchristian) was a Norse skald, active around the year 1000. The only thing known about him is that he was one of the court poets of Earl Eiríkr Hákonarson. Eight dróttkvætt verses by him are extant, preserved in the kings' sagas. They contain a lively description of the battle of Svolder. Heimskringla attributes at least some of those stanzas to a flokkr on Earl Eiríkr and scholars sometimes refer to them as Eiríksflokkr. The following is one of the eight verses.

The extant sources do not explain the epithet "ókristni" (unchristian) but it is known that although Earl Eiríkr adopted Christianity, at least nominally, he was tolerant of paganism and his court poets praised him in traditional pagan terms.

Notes

References 
 Halldór ókristni: Eiríksflokkr Preservation and text, including Finnur Jónsson's edition
 Christiansen, Eric (2002). The Norsemen in the Viking Age. Blackwell Publishing. 
Finlay, Alison (editor and translator) (2004). Fagrskinna, a Catalogue of the Kings of Norway. Brill Academic Publishers. 
Thunberg, Carl L. (2012). Att tolka Svitjod [To interpret Svitjod]. Göteborgs universitet. CLTS. .

10th-century Norwegian poets